Gambirasio is an Italian surname. Notable people with the surname include:

Patrizio Gambirasio (born 1961), Italian cyclist
Yara Gambirasio (1997–2010), Italian murder victim

Italian-language surnames